L'Affrontement des Prétendants is an album by French clarinetist Louis Sclavis recorded in 1999 and released on the ECM label.

Reception
The Allmusic review by Thom Jurek awarded the album 4½ stars stating "it is as a quintet this band plays, as a musical unit that is seasoned and confident and in full possession of its strengths and musical empathies. So democratic and accomplished is this band that it sounds as if it has no leader, but only music to play. And that's as high a compliment as any reviewer can pay".

Track listing
All compositions by Louis Sclavis except as indicated
 "L' Affrontement des Prétendants" - 8:45 
 "Distances" (Vincent Courtois, Sclavis) - 3:19 
 "Contre Contre" - 6:40 
 "Hors les Murs" (Bruno Chevillon) - 2:50 
 "Possibles" - 5:25 
 "Hommage À Lounès Matoub" - 16:59 
 "Le Temps d'Après" - 8:06 
 "Maputo Introduction" - 2:32 
 "Maputo" 6:32 
 "La Mémoire des Mains" (Chevillon, François Merville, Sclavis) - 2:29 
Recorded at Studios La Buissonne in Pernes-Les-Fontaines, France in September 1999.

Personnel
Louis Sclavis — clarinet, bass clarinet, soprano saxophone
Jean-Luc Cappozzo — trumpet
Vincent Courtois — cello
Bruno Chevillon — double bass
François Merville — drums

References

ECM Records albums
Louis Sclavis albums
2001 albums
Albums produced by Manfred Eicher